Bala Qusarqışlaq (also, Bala-Kusary) is a village in the Khachmaz Rayon of Azerbaijan.  The village forms part of the municipality of Həsənqala.

References 

Populated places in Khachmaz District